Tommy James Turner (May 16, 1963 – August 24, 2009) was an American football defensive end in the National Football League for the Miami Dolphins.  He played college football for the University of Houston. A 1981 Parade All-American, he was considered to be the top defensive end prospect in the nation coming out of high school. At Houston, he had 30 sacks, and compiled 19 sacks and 180 tackles in his last two seasons. His 52 tackles in 1982 were the most by a freshman in Houston history. As a Dolphin, he was given the nickname "Wrong-Way T.J." after taking a wrong turn onto the Florida Turnpike, blaming the mistake on the confusing Golden Glades Interchange. He drove 50 miles before attempting to turn around, at which point he flipped his truck and was cited for careless driving. He died on August 24, 2009 at age of 46.

References

External links

1963 births
2009 deaths
People from Lufkin, Texas
Players of American football from Texas
American football defensive linemen
Houston Cougars football players
Miami Dolphins players